The name Vallabha means lover or beloved in Sanskrit. It is a name of Vishnu. It is sometimes spelled as Vallabh or Vallava. Notable people with this name include:

 Vallabha (philosopher), an ancient Indian philosopher and acharya
 Vallabharaja, a king of Gujarat
 Lakshmi Vallabha, a name for Vishnu
 Vallabha Devi, Thai princess

Indian given names